Mattias Vegnaduzzo (born 5 October 1983) is an Argentine footballer.

Club career
Vegnaduzzo suffered a knee injury in early 2005, which prevented him from playing in the Argentine Primera with Club Atlético Huracán.

Vegnaduzzo scored 3 goals in 25 appearances for Club Atlético Acassuso in Argentina's Primera B Metropolitana during the 2007–08 season .

On 22 July 2017, he joined to Grosseto.

References

External links
Mattias Vegnaduzzo at aic.football.it 

1983 births
Living people
People from San Isidro, Buenos Aires
Sportspeople from Buenos Aires Province
Argentine footballers
Association football midfielders
Argentine Primera División players
Club Atlético Platense footballers
Chacarita Juniors footballers
Club Atlético Huracán footballers
Club Atlético Acassuso footballers
Colorado Rapids players
Serie C players
Serie D players
Eccellenza players
A.S.D. AVC Vogherese 1919 players
S.S.D. Città di Gela players
Casale F.B.C. players
U.S. Viterbese 1908 players
Ascoli Calcio 1898 F.C. players
A.S.D. Città di Foligno 1928 players
A.S.D. Civitavecchia 1920 players
F.C. Grosseto S.S.D. players
S.S.D. Varese Calcio players
Argentine expatriate footballers
Argentine expatriate sportspeople in Italy
Argentine expatriate sportspeople in the United States
Expatriate footballers in Italy
Expatriate soccer players in the United States